Senator Panzer may refer to:

Frank E. Panzer (1890–1969), Wisconsin State Senate
Mary Panzer (born 1951), Wisconsin State Senate